The second season of the American sitcom Frasier commenced airing in the United States on September 20, 1994, and concluded on May 23, 1995. It continues to follow Dr. Frasier Crane's experiences as a radio psychiatrist and efforts to get closer to his father and brother. The second season aired Tuesdays at 9:00 pm in the United States after moving from its previous Thursday night time slot. The season was released on DVD as a four-disc boxed set on January 6, 2004, by Paramount Home Entertainment.

In 1997, TV Guide ranked "The Matchmaker" No. 43 on its list of the 100 Greatest Episodes.

Cast

Main
 Kelsey Grammer as Frasier Crane
 Jane Leeves as Daphne Moon
 David Hyde Pierce as Niles Crane
 Peri Gilpin as Roz Doyle
 John Mahoney as Martin Crane

Special guest
 Bebe Neuwirth as Lilith
 JoBeth Williams as Madeline
 John C. McGinley as Danny
 Nathan Lane as Phil
 Ted Danson as Sam Malone

Special appearance by
 Dan Butler as Bulldog
 Shelly Long as Diane Chambers

Recurring
 Edward Hibbert as Gil Chesterton

Guest
 John O'Hurley as Thomas Jay Fallow
 Eric Lutes as Tom Duran
 Boyd Gaines as Phil Patterson
 Mike Starr as Billy
 Shannon Tweed as Dr. Honey Snow
 Téa Leoni as Sheila
 W. Morgan Sheppard as Mr. Drake
 Jim Norton as Wentworth
 Harriet Sansom Harris as Bebe Glazer
 Diedrich Bader as Brad

Episodes

References

1994 American television seasons
1995 American television seasons
Frasier 02